Zyuratkul is a freshwater lake in Satkinsky District, Chelyabinsk Oblast, Russia. 

The name "Zyuratkul" comes from the Bashkir "yöräk/kul" (йөрәк/күл), meaning "heart/lake".

In 1993 the Zyuratkul National Park, a protected area, was established in the lake and its surroundings.

Geography
Its southern shore stretches at the feet of the northern slopes of the larger Nurgush range. Previously, in its natural state, the lake was smaller and surrounded by swamps. After WWII a dam was built and the new reservoir doubled the surface area of the ancient lake.

The water of Zyuratkul is not as clear as is normal in high-altitude lakes. The reason is that the inflowing watercourses originate in swamps. The Bolshaya Satka, a left hand tributary of the Ay, is the outflow of the lake.

See also
List of lakes of Russia
Zyuratkul Geoglyph

References

External links

Lake Zyuratkul pictures 
Путешествия по России 35 самых красивых мест, которые должен увидеть каждый (35 most beautiful spots in Russia)

Zyuratkul
Reservoirs in Russia